Gribshunden or Griffen (English: "Griffin-Hound" or "Griffin"), also known by several variant names including Gribshund, Gripshunden, Gripshund, Griff, and Griffone, was a Danish warship, the flagship of John, King of Denmark (r. 1481–1513). Gribshunden sank in 1495 after catching fire while in the Baltic Sea off the coast of Ronneby in southeastern Sweden; she is one of the best-preserved wrecks from the late medieval period.

History

The first known mention of the ship is in a letter, dated May 16, 1486, in which John, King of Denmark, wrote "in navi nostra Griffone", Latin for "in our ship Griffon". Gribshunden and its variant names were then subsequently recorded in the Danish fleet's ship lists from 1487 to 1495.

In summer 1495, John set sail for Kalmar, Sweden, to enter into negotiations with Sten Sture the Elder, the Swedish leader who was threatening to break the Swedes away from the Kalmar Union. As the premier ship of the Danish fleet, Gribshunden was a symbol of military power intended to help deter the Swedes from independence.

However, on the way to Kalmar, while anchored in the Baltic Sea at the natural harbor near the port of Ronneby, Sweden, Gribshunden caught fire. This event was recorded in the contemporaneous Swedish Sturekrönikan (The Sture Chronicle) and in two German sources, Reimar Koch's Lübeck Chronicle and Caspar Weinreich's Danzig Chronicle. John himself was not aboard at the time, but, as reported by expedition member Tyge Krabbe, many of the 150 crewmen who were on the ship died as it sank. John continued to Kalmar after the loss of his flagship, but Sten Sture did not turn up for the meeting, leaving the status of the Kalmar Union in limbo for the next two years until the 1497 Battle of Rotebro, wherein the Union was reaffirmed by John's victory and Sten's defeat.

The wreck

Unaware of the identity and significance of the wreck, the divers did not tell archaeologists about the discovery until 2000; the first archaeological investigations followed in 2001 and 2002. In 2013, archaeologists identified the ship as Gribshunden through such techniques as dendrochronological sampling of the ship's timbers, which showed that they came from oak trees felled in the winter of 1482–1483.

The wooden ship is in remarkably good condition and is among the best-preserved ships from the late medieval period. That the wreckage has been left relatively free of sea worm damage has been attributed to the brackishness of the waters.

The ship is also significant for being carvel-built, the oldest such found in Nordic waters, which were at the time dominated by clinker-built ships. The keel is oriented northeast to southwest.

Among the military artifacts found in the wreckage are chain mail, crossbows, bones, barrels, glass, and capstans. The shipwreck remains loaded with artillery consisting of iron cannons, of which 11 mountings have been counted. The artillery consists of light, anti-personnel guns and were not intended for the sinking of ships. Instead, they mainly offered support for hand-to-hand combat forces, which constituted the main fighting force. The infantry also was capable of fighting at medium ranges as evidenced by the finds from the recent excavation of 2019 (led by Södertörn University, Lund University, and Blekinge Museum) which uncovered, among other things, a crossbow, crossbow bolt, handgonne (early handheld firearm), and mail armor. A 13.5-foot-long gun carriage and carved linstock was found in 2021. 

Suggestive of the ship's Gribshunden ("Griffin-Hound") name, the chimeric figurehead is described as a dog-like or dragon-like sea monster with lion ears, devouring a person in its crocodilian mouth.

A 2019-2021 led excavation has additionally found silver coins, decorated wall paneling in birch, wood tankard emblazoned with a crown, slippers, and exotic spices.

A 2021 episode of the American science show NOVA profiles the underwater archeological investigation of Gribshunden.

References

15th-century maritime incidents
15th-century ships
Age of Sail individual ships
Archaeology of shipwrecks
Naval ships of Denmark
Ship fires
Shipwrecks in the Baltic Sea
Shipwrecks of Sweden